Elections to the New York City Common Council were held in November 1808. The incumbent Democratic-Republican Party retained its majority but the Federalists gained one seat and increased their share of the vote in every ward.

Results

References

New York City Council elections
1808 New York (state) elections